Binkang Road is a station on Line 1 and Line 5 of Hangzhou Metro in China. It was opened in November 2012, together with the rest of the stations on Line 1. It is located in Binjiang District, Hangzhou.

Gallery

References

Railway stations in Zhejiang
Railway stations in China opened in 2012
Hangzhou Metro stations